The 2011 Supercheap Auto Bathurst 1000 was an Australian touring car motor race for V8 Supercars. The race was on Sunday, 9 October 2011 at the Mount Panorama Circuit just outside Bathurst, New South Wales, Australia and was Race 20 of the 2011 International V8 Supercars Championship. It was the fifteenth running of the Australian 1000 race, first held after the organisational split over the Bathurst 1000 that occurred in 1997. It was also the 54th race for which the lineage can be traced back to the 1960 Armstrong 500 held at Phillip Island.

The race was won by Garth Tander and Nick Percat of the Holden Racing Team by 0.3 of a second over defending race winners Craig Lowndes and Mark Skaife of the Triple Eight Race Engineering team. Tander was forced to resist a last minute charge from Lowndes as Tander's car faded in the closing laps. The Kelly Racing car of Greg Murphy and Allan Simonsen finished third, completing a Holden Commodore clean sweep of the podium positions. Percat became the first South Australian born driver to win the Bathurst 1000, although South Australian raised Russell Ingall had won the race previously.

Background
The race saw expanded international television coverage with United States-based cable channel Speed broadcast the race live throughout North America, the first time a V8 Supercar race had been televised live on the continent. The network sent its own commentary team, with well-regarded lead Mike Joy, three-time Monster Energy NASCAR Cup Series champion Darrell Waltrip, pit reporters Calvin Fish, and former Network Ten commentator Leigh Diffey (who led Ten's coverage of the race in the late 1990s and early 2000s). The network's decision to broadcast this race, as well as the Gold Coast 600, came on the heels of the series' announcement that it would stage a round in the United States, beginning in 2013.

Entry List
The race saw the entry of one wildcard, through Kelly Racing's Shannons Supercar Showdown television show. Cameron Waters, one of the drivers of the wildcard entry, would become the youngest ever Bathurst 1000 starter at 17 years, 2 months and 6 days old - beating the previous record (set by Paul Dumbrell in 1999) by 8 days.

*Entries with a grey background were wildcard entries which did not compete in the full championship season.

Practice
Thursday practice was plagued by rain and rumours over the condition of Dunlop's supply of wet weather tyres. Fog caused the third practice session to be cancelled while the tyre supply situation was clarified.

Tim Slade in the James Rosenberg Racing Falcon was fastest in the first session on Thursday, setting a 2:24.2255 lap time in damp conditions. Slade's Stone Brothers Racing teammate Shane van Gisbergen was second fastest ahead of James Moffat. Reigning series champion James Courtney was the fastest Holden, 1.4 seconds behind Slade. The second session, only for co-drivers, was slower and wetter. Ford Performance Racing's Steven Richards was fastest at 2:27.8960, over three seconds behind the previous session. David Besnard (Dick Johnson Racing) was second fastest ahead of the first Holden, David Russell of Kelly Racing who was just ahead of 2010 Bathurst winner, Mark Skaife.

The Friday morning session gained new importance when V8 Supercar series points leader Jamie Whincup crashed at the Cutting, crashing hard enough to bend his car's chassis rails. Cameron McConville took his Holden Racing Team Commodore to the top of the co-driver practice session ahead of Skaife and Richards, with McConville setting a 2:09.8765 in the dry, while Shane van Gisbergen set the fastest time of the meeting thus far at 2:07.6035, ahead of Whincup prior to his crash and Mark Winterbottom, while Brad Jones Racing left the #14 Holden of Jason Bargwanna and Shane Price on the sidelines, changing an engine.

Qualifying
Holden Racing Team's Garth Tander set the fastest lap time during the qualifying session on Friday. Tander set a 2:07.6640 lap time to secure the prime final position in the Top Ten Shootout to be held on Saturday morning. Tander set the time late in the session and was good enough to hold off a last lap effort from Mark Winterbottom. Winterbottom was five hundredths of a second slower than Tander with Jamie Whincup three hundredths further away in his repaired Commodore. David Reynolds and Kelly Racing teammate Greg Murphy climbed up the order on their final laps. Craig Lowndes (Triple Eight Race Engineering), James Courtney, Lee Holdsworth (Garry Rogers Motorsport), Shane van Gisbergen and Steve Owen (Paul Morris Motorsport) secured the other positions in the top ten shootout. Will Davison just missed out on the top ten by five hundredths of a second with his Ford Performance Racing teammate Paul Dumbrell also just missing out in the final moments. Alex Davison (Stone Brothers Racing), Michael Caruso (Garry Rogers Motorsport) and Tim Slade completed the top 15. Following the session, Lee Holdsworth was demoted five grid positions after he missed the scales at the end of qualifying. The penalty sees Will Davison move into the top ten shootout.

29th and last was the Kelly Racing Commodore of TV weather presenter Grant Denyer who made a return to racing after a long layoff to mentor the winner of a reality TV competition aimed at discovering young racing drivers. The winner, Cameron Waters, became the youngest driver to ever compete for the race.

The only serious set-back in qualifying was a last lap crash when Jason Bargwanna hit the wall at the Esses, heavily damaging the front end of his Brad Jones Racing Commodore.

Shootout
Will Davison was the first driver out in the shootout, setting a time of 2:08.8821. Steve Owen, Shane van Gisbergen, James Courtney and Craig Lowndes all failed to better Davison's time, Lowndes coming closest with a 2:09.2197. 2003 pole-sitter Greg Murphy was three tenths up at the first split and went on to beat Davison by eight one hundredths of a second with a 2:08.8009, which would prove to be the pole time. Murphy's teammate David Reynolds complained of smoke in the cabin from a gearbox issue at the start of his lap, going slowest with a 2:10.1570. Jamie Whincup, Mark Winterbottom and Garth Tander all had their laps ruined when rain started to fall, Whincup having a few moments on his lap. Winterbottom coasted around to take tenth place while Tander pushed a bit harder to take ninth.

Results

Qualifying

Notes:
 – Lee Holdsworth qualified eighth and was eligible to take part in the Top Ten Shootout, but failed to present his car to the race stewards after qualifying and was given a five-place grid penalty. Will Davison was promoted to tenth and the Shootout in his place.

Top ten shootout

Starting grid
The following table represents the final starting grid for the race on Sunday:

Race results

Championship standings
 After 20 of 28 races, the top five positions in the 2011 V8 Supercars Championship drivers standings were as follows:

References

External links
Official race website
Official timing and results
Official series website

Supercheap Auto Bathurst 1000
Motorsport in Bathurst, New South Wales